Fuzzy mathematics  is the branch of mathematics including fuzzy set theory and fuzzy logic that deals with partial inclusion of elements in a set on a spectrum, as opposed to simple binary "yes" or "no" (0 or 1) inclusion.  It started in 1965 after the publication of Lotfi Asker Zadeh's seminal work Fuzzy sets. Linguistics is an example of a field that utilizes fuzzy set theory.

Definition
A fuzzy subset A of a set X is a function A: X → L, where L is the interval [0, 1]. This function is also called a membership function. A membership function is a generalization of an indicator function (also called a characteristic function) of a subset defined for L = {0, 1}.  More generally, one can use any complete lattice L in a definition of a fuzzy subset A.

Fuzzification
The evolution of the fuzzification of mathematical concepts can be broken down into three stages: 
 straightforward fuzzification during the sixties and seventies,
 the explosion of the possible choices in the generalization process during the eighties,
 the standardization, axiomatization, and L-fuzzification in the nineties.

Usually, a fuzzification of mathematical concepts is based on a generalization of these concepts from characteristic functions to membership functions. Let A and B be two fuzzy subsets of X. 

An important generalization principle used in fuzzification of algebraic operations is a closure property. Let * be a binary operation on X. The closure property for a fuzzy subset A of X is that for all x, y in X, A(x*y) ≥ min(A(x), A(y)). Let (G, *) be a group and A a fuzzy subset of G. Then A is a fuzzy subgroup of G if for all x, y in G, A(x*y−1) ≥ min(A(x), A(y−1)). 

A similar generalization principle is used, for example, for fuzzification of the transitivity property. Let R be a fuzzy relation on X, i.e. R is a fuzzy subset of X × X. Then R is (fuzzy-)transitive if for all x, y, z in X, R(x, z) ≥ min(R(x, y), R(y, z)).

Fuzzy analogues 

Fuzzy subgroupoids and fuzzy subgroups were introduced in 1971 by A. Rosenfeld.

Analogues of other mathematical subjects have been translated to fuzzy mathematics, such as fuzzy field theory and fuzzy Galois theory, fuzzy topology, fuzzy geometry, fuzzy orderings, and fuzzy graphs.

See also
 Fuzzy measure theory
 Fuzzy subalgebra
 Monoidal t-norm logic
 Possibility theory
 T-norm

References

External links 

 Zadeh, L.A. Fuzzy Logic - article at Scholarpedia
 Hajek, P. Fuzzy Logic - article at Stanford Encyclopedia of Philosophy
 Navara, M. Triangular Norms and Conorms - article at Scholarpedia
 Dubois, D., Prade H. Possibility Theory - article at Scholarpedia
 Center for Mathematics of Uncertainty Fuzzy Math Research - Web site hosted at Creighton University
 Seising, R.  Book on the history of the mathematical theory of Fuzzy Sets: The Fuzzification of Systems. The Genesis of Fuzzy Set Theory and Its Initial Applications -- Developments up to the 1970s (Studies in Fuzziness and Soft Computing, Vol. 216) Berlin, New York, [et al.]: Springer 2007.

Fuzzy logic